Our Lady and St Peter's Church, Bothamsall is a Grade II listed parish church in the Church of England in Bothamsall. The church is part of the Lound Hall Estate, Bothamsall. The buildings repair costs are procured by the Lord of the manor.

History

The church dates from the 14th century. A design by William Wilkins of 1817 was rejected and the church was rebuilt in 1845 by Henry Pelham-Clinton, 4th Duke of Newcastle with stone from Worksop Manor.

It is in a joint parish with 
St. Nicholas' Church, Askham
All Saints' Church, Babworth
St Martin's Church, Bole
St John the Baptist Church, Clarborough
All Saints' Church, Eaton
St Giles' Church, Elkesley
St Peter's Church, Gamston
St. Helen's Church, Grove
St Peter's Church, Hayton
St Martin's Church, North Leverton
St Peter and St Paul's Church, North Wheatley
All Hallows' Church, Ordsall
St Saviour's Church Retford
St Swithun's Church, East Retford
St Michael the Archangel's Church, Retford
All Saints' Church, South Leverton
St Paul's Church, West Drayton
St Peter and St Paul's Church, Sturton-le-Steeple
St Martin's Church, Ranby
St Bartholomew's Church, Sutton-cum-Lound

See also
Listed buildings in Bothamsall

References

Bothamsall
Bothamsall
Bothamsall